Tuncay Becedek (19 July 1942 – 23 April 2021) was a Turkish footballer. He played in three matches for the Turkey national football team from 1962 to 1965.

References

External links
 
 

1942 births
2021 deaths
Turkish footballers
Turkey international footballers
Place of birth missing
Association football midfielders
Fatih Karagümrük S.K. footballers
İstanbulspor footballers
Fenerbahçe S.K. footballers
İzmirspor footballers
Bursaspor footballers
Kocaelispor footballers